Angel broadcasting network LTD is a media group in Ghana. Established in 2007, it has 16 radio stations, two news websites, and three satellite television network.

The Network has won several local and international awards for its tenacious work of giving credible information to our cherished Listeners and readers in Ghana and the world.

Angel Broadcasting Network LTD was established in 2007 by Ghanaian entrepreneur Dr Kwaku Oteng with the first radio station which went on air in 2007 starting with 15 employees. The media group was started in Kumasi, Ghana

In August 2021, a fire gutted the studios of Angel TV, damaging all of the channel's equipment. In spite of the building being a near-total loss, the channel returned to air within 24 hours

Services
General administration, sales, programming, production, news, advertising etc

Radio stations 
Angel Broadcasting Network LTD owns sixteen radio stations in all the 16 regions in Ghana
 The stations are:
•             Angel Fm Kumasi

•             Pure Fm Kumasi

•             ABN Radio 1 Kumasi

•             Angel FM Accra

•             Angel FM Sunyani

•             Cheers FM Sunyani

•             Angel FM Koforidua

•             OFM Obuasi

•             Cheers FM Takoradi

•             Darling FM Cape coast

•             KFM Techiman

•             Angel FM Bolga

•             Angel FM Tamale

•             Taste FM Koforidua

•             Angel Fm HO

•             Cheers FM Drobo

Television stations;

•             Angel TV

•             Adonko TV

•             ONE HD TV

Staff 
The group employs over 1500 casual and permanent workers. In November 2022, eight staff were sent to BBC for training and capacity building. The Network has top media Personalities like Saddick Adams Ghana Journalist Association (GJA) Jounalist of the year 2018 and Sports Writers Association of Ghana (SWAG) journalist of the year 2022,  Multiple award-winning newscaster Kwadwo Dickson, Don Summer  multiple award-winning Political Host  Kwame Adinkra, Kofi Adoma Nwanwani, DJ Slim, Captain Smart, Bright Kamkam Boadu , Esther Abankwah, Kofi Owusu Jerry, OB Trice, Oliver khan, Listowel Mensah Daniel, Nana Yaa Brefo, Kwamena Sam Biney, Ohenemaa Woyeje, Francisca Oteng-Mensah, Ghana Football Legends Charlse Taylor, Prince Tagoe, Awudu Issaka

International Broadcast success 
The Network acquire the media rights of these:

 Euro 2016
 Spanish Copa Del Rey 2016
 International champions cup 2017
 English Premier League 2018
 Afcon 2021

Awards 
The Network has won through its media houses has several awards including:

 RTP Digital Television station of the year 2018, 2019, 2020, and 2021

References

External links
 

Television stations in Ghana

https://www.ghanaweb.com/GhanaHomePage/entertainment/Angel-TV-s-Ohemaa-Woye-Supa-wins-Woman-of-the-Year-at-2022-TGAEA-1639094?gallery=1 

https://mediafillasgh.com/rtpawards2019-angel-96-1fm-sports-wins-best-sports-show-for-the-4th-time/

https://angelonline.com.gh/2021/12/22/team-van-wins-the-maiden-edition-of-woso/

https://www.ghanaweb.com/GhanaHomePage/entertainment/RTP-Awards-Angel-FM-wins-Best-Radio-Station-in-Ashanti-Region-again-1397011

https://www.mynewsgh.com/networks-20-radio-tv-stations-to-shape-ghanas-media-space-abn-ceo/

https://www.ghanaweb.com/GhanaHomePage/SportsArchive/One-of-the-best-moments-in-my-life-Saddick-Adams-after-winning-SWAG-journalist-of-the-year-1426645

https://www.bloomberg.com/profile/person/20525635#xj4y7vzkg